Abrams Creek may refer to:
Abrams Creek (Tennessee)
Abrams Creek (Virginia)

See also
 Abrams Run, a stream in West Virginia
 Abram Creek (disambiguation)